Chautara Sangachokgadhi is a municipality in Sindhupalchowk District in Bagmati Province of central Nepal. The municipality was established on 18 May 2014 by merging Pipaldanda, Chautara, Kubhinde, Sanusiruwari Village Development Committees as Chautara Municipality. Later on 2017 it was expended again merging Sangachok, Thulo Sirubari, Kadambas, Irkhu, Batase and Syaule Village Development Committees to form Chautara Sangachowkgadi Municipality. It is now divided to 14 wards. This is the district headquarters of the Sindhupalchowk District. The municipality stands at the elevation of approximately 1,600 m above sea level. Religious and cultural festivities form a major part of the lives of people residing in Chautara. There are people of various religious beliefs, Hinduism, Buddhism and Christianity as well, giving Chautara a cosmopolitan culture. Nepali is the most commonly spoken language in the municipality. Likewise, Newari and other languages such as Tamang is also spoken as the Newars and Tamangs dominate the settlement in population.

Geography 
Chautara is located in the northern part of Nepal and covers an area of around 50 square kilometers. The average elevation is 1,600 metres above sea level. Chautara is in the Deciduous Monsoon Forest Zone, one of five vegetation zones defined for Nepal. The dominant tree species in this zone are oak, pine, beech, maple and others, with coniferous trees at higher altitude.

Ethnic groups 
The largest ethnic groups are Sherpa, Newar, Brahmin, Chhetri, Gurung, Magars, Tamang, etc. The major languages are Newar, Tamang, Nepali, Nepal Bhasa and English is understood by majority of people. The major religions are Hinduism, Buddhism and Christianity.

Cuisine 
The staple food of the people of Chautara is dal bhat. It consists of rice and lentil soup, generally served with vegetable curries, achar and sometimes chutney. Momo, a type of Nepali version of Tibetan dumpling, has become prominent in Chautara with many street vendors selling it. It is one of the most popular fast foods in Chautara. Various Nepali variants of momo including buff momo, chicken momo, and vegetarian momo are famous in Chautara. However, the practice of vegetarianism is not uncommon, and vegetarian cuisines can be found throughout the city. Buff (meat of water buffalo) is very common. The chief breakfast for locals and visitors is mostly Momo or Chowmein.

Festivals 
The festivities such as the Loshar, Dashain, Tihar, Shivratri and many more are observed by all Hindu and Buddhist communities of Chautara. Some of the traditional festivals observed in Chautara apart from those previously mentioned, are Loshar, Bada Dashain, Tihar, Maghe Sankranti, Naga Panchami, Janai Poornima, Teej/Rishi Panchami, Gaurati Jatra, saune sagrati etc.

Sports 
Football and Cricket are the most popular sports among the younger generation in Chautara. The only ground in the city is the Chautara Tudhikhel Ground, a multi-purpose ground used mostly for football matches and cultural events. Several football matches are conducted in this ground every year. Chautara is home to the football clubs such as Chautara Sporting Club (CSC), Star Club, Kshitiz Club, Tol Sudhar etc.

Media 
To Promote local culture, Chautara has two FM radio stations. Radio Sindhu - 105 MHz which is a community radio station and the newly established Radio Planet - 89.1 MHz situated near the bus park of Chautara. Sundar Shireesh has publish a Bihanee Media Homes, Bihanee Times Weekly, www.aksharpati.com, Sindhu Jagaran Weekly and many more Media.

2015 Nepal Earthquake 
The town was severely affected by the earthquake on 25 April 2015. Over ninety percent of the homes in the town had been destroyed. The main hospital of the town had collapsed. The town suffered from water shortages. Relief workers and the Nepali army met government officials in Chautara to discuss the emergency response to the humanitarian crisis. However, government officials have stayed out of sight due to the anger of the residents of the town. Dozens of people crowded in front of the administrative office in Chautara, demanding that officials deliver more tents to earthquake survivors sleeping without shelter. The government had tents, but they were not given to the residents of the town.

References

External links
 Official website

Populated places in Sindhupalchowk District
Municipalities in Bagmati Province
Nepal municipalities established in 2014